Turnbull Creek Educational State Forest (TCESF) is a  North Carolina State Forest in Elizabethtown, North Carolina.  It is the only educational state forest located in North Carolina's coastal plain.  Jones Lake State Park is adjacent to the forest, and both are surrounded by Bladen Lakes State Forest.  The forest's primary purpose is public education of forestry practices.

References

External links 
 

North Carolina state forests
Protected areas of Bladen County, North Carolina
Education in Bladen County, North Carolina
Open-air museums in North Carolina